Q'uwa Qullu (Aymara q'uwa a medical plant, qullu mountain, "q'uwa mountain", also spelled Coa Kkollu) is a  mountain in the Bolivian Andes. It is located in the La Paz Department, Inquisivi Province, in the southern parts of the Colquiri Municipality. Q'uwa Qullu lies northwest of Ch'iyar Jaqhi.

References 

Mountains of La Paz Department (Bolivia)